Engen (延元) was a Japanese era of the Southern Court during the Era of Northern and Southern Courts after Kenmu and before Kōkoku, lasting from February 1336 to April 1340.  Reigning Emperors were Emperor Go-Daigo and Emperor Go-Murakami in the south and Emperor Kōmyō in the north.

Nanboku-chō overview
   
During the Meiji period, an Imperial decree dated March 3, 1911 established that the legitimate reigning monarchs of this period were the direct descendants of Emperor Go-Daigo through Emperor Go-Murakami, whose  had been established in exile in Yoshino, near Nara.

Until the end of the Edo period, the militarily superior pretender-Emperors supported by the Ashikaga shogunate had been mistakenly incorporated in Imperial chronologies despite the undisputed fact that the Imperial Regalia were not in their possession.

This illegitimate  had been established in Kyoto by Ashikaga Takauji.

Northern Court Equivalents
Kenmu (continued)
Ryakuō

References

External links
 National Diet Library, "The Japanese Calendar" – historical overview plus illustrative images from library's collection
 Titsingh, Isaac. (1834). Nihon Ōdai Ichiran; ou,  Annales des empereurs du Japon.  Paris: Royal Asiatic Society, Oriental Translation Fund of Great Britain and Ireland. OCLC 5850691

Japanese eras
1330s in Japan